"(There's) No Gettin' Over Me" is a song written by Walt Aldridge and Tom Brasfield, and recorded by American country music singer Ronnie Milsap.  It was released in June 1981 as the first single from the album There's No Gettin' Over Me.  Known by many fans by its less grammatically correct title "There Ain't No Gettin' Over Me" — the song's official title appears nowhere in the lyrics — the song became one of Milsap's biggest country and pop hits during his recording career.

Critical reception
Thom Jurek of Allmusic wrote that "(There's) No Gettin' Over Me" — and the album from which it came — was "indicative of the times and the artists making hit records at the same time." Milsap's "urban country" style, as Jurek put it, was evident in the song, given its "sweet alto saxophone solo" and "chorus that reflects James Taylor's late-'70s attempts at crooning early rock."

Cover versions
A cover version was recorded by Heartland on their 2006 album I Loved Her First.

In 2018, Milsap rerecorded the song with Kacey Musgraves, which appeared on his 2019 album Ronnie Milsap: The Duets.

Commercial performance
His 18th No. 1 hit on the Billboard Hot Country Singles chart in August 1981, "(There's) No Gettin' Over Me" marked the apex of Milsap's popularity as a crossover artist, reaching No. 5 for 5 weeks on the Billboard Hot 100 chart and number two  Hot Adult Contemporary Singles.

A video was also produced of the song, and it has aired on The Nashville Network, CMT and GAC.

Chart history

Weekly charts

Year-end charts

References

Works cited
Whitburn, Joel, "Top Country Songs: 1944-2005," 2006.
Whitburn, Joel, "Top Pop Singles: 1955-2006," 2007.

1981 singles
1981 songs
Ronnie Milsap songs
Heartland (band) songs
Kacey Musgraves songs
Songs written by Walt Aldridge
Songs written by Tom Brasfield
Song recordings produced by Tom Collins (record producer)
RCA Records singles